During the 2008–09 VfB Stuttgart season, the club was a genuine contender for the Bundesliga title, losing out only to VfL Wolfsburg and Bayern Munich and finishing in third position. Striker Mario Gómez scored 24 goals in the Bundesliga campaign, only to then make a shock switch to rivals Bayern for the highest-received transfer fee in the club's history.

Players

First-team squad
Squad at end of season

Left club during season

VfB Stuttgart II
VfB Stuttgart II were coached by Rainer Adrion and finished 11th in the 3. Liga.

Bundesliga

Classification

Results

Statistics

Top scorers
  Mario Gómez 24
  Cacau 7
  Thomas Hitzlsperger 5
  Sami Khedira 5
  Ciprian Marica 4

Notes

References

VfB Stuttgart seasons
Stuttgart